Pelecyphora strobiliformis is a species of cactus from Mexico. Its numbers in the wild have been reduced by collecting; it is listed in Appendix I of CITES (meaning that international trade is severely controlled) but only as of "Least Concern" by the IUCN.

References

Cactoideae
Cacti of Mexico
Plants described in 1927